Apel or APEL may refer to:

Places
 Apel, Limpopo, town in Sekhukhune District Municipality in the Limpopo province of South Africa
 Ter Apel, town in the municipality Vlagtwedde in the northern Netherlands

Other uses 
Apel (surname)
APEL or "Accreditation of Prior Experiential Learning", the formal recognition of prior learning by UK universities
Apel (emacs), A Portable Emacs Library.
Apel-stones
Apel Codex
Authorized Protective Eyewear List
Apel (film), a 1970 animated short film by Ryszard Czekała

See also
 Abel (surname)
 Apple (disambiguation)
 Appel (disambiguation)
 Appell, a surname
 Apfel, a surname